Scuderia Filipinetti (also French name Ecurie Filipinetti) was a Swiss motor racing team that competed in sports car racing and occasionally in Formula One between 1962 and 1973. It was founded by Georges Filipinetti (1907-1973) to support Swiss driver Jo Siffert, but employed many other drivers including Jim Clark, Phil Hill and Ronnie Peterson. Filipinetti initially named the team as Ecurie Nationale Suisse, but changed it after complaints from the Automobile Club de Suisse.

The team ran its cars in a red and white livery and most often used Ferrari cars, although it also employed cars from other manufacturers like FIAT and Chevrolet; the team's 1968 Chevrolet Corvette L88 made its Le Mans debut in 1968 and returned for the 24 Hours of Le Mans five more times – consecutively – until 1973, a record that remains unbroken by any single chassis.

Drivers
Noted drivers who drove from Scuderia Filipinetti between 1962 and 1973:
 Jim Clark
 Phil Hill
 Ronnie Peterson
 Jo Siffert
 Herbert Müller
 Willy Mairesse
 Jo Bonnier
 Nino Vaccarella
 Dieter Spoerry
 Mike Parkes
 Walter Donna
 Philippe Albera
 André Wicky

Complete Formula One World Championship results
(key)

References

External links
 Filipinetti X1/9 - All about the first X1/9 racecar from Scuderia Filipinetti
 TSR Audiovisuelles Archiv Scuderia Filipinetti Geneva 1962 (French)
 A photo of the team's Le Mans Corvette in 2009

Formula One entrants
Formula Two entrants
Can-Am entrants
Swiss auto racing teams

24 Hours of Le Mans teams